Tucanes de Amazonas Fútbol Club (usually called Tucanes de Amazonas) is a professional club promoted to Venezuelan league in 2011. The club is based in Puerto Ayacucho.

Titles
Primera División Venezolana: 0
Amateur Era (0):
Professional Era (0):

Segunda División Venezolana: 0
Segunda División B Venezolana: 0
Tercera División Venezolana: 0
Copa de Venezuela: 0

Current first team squad

Soccerway; Jugadores de Tucanes de Amazonas

External links
 Official Site 

Association football clubs established in 2008
Football clubs in Venezuela
2008 establishments in Venezuela
Amazonas (Venezuelan state)
Puerto Ayacucho